As of January 2023, there are a total of 1,157 World Heritage Sites located across 167 countries, of which 900 are cultural, 218 are natural and 39 are mixed properties. The countries have been divided by the World Heritage Committee into five geographic zones: Africa, Arab States, Asia and the Pacific, Europe and North America, and Latin America and the Caribbean. With 58 selected areas, Italy is the country with the most sites on the list.

Of the 194 state parties of the World Heritage Convention, 27 have no properties inscribed on the World Heritage List: The Bahamas, Bhutan, Brunei, Burundi, Comoros, Cook Islands, Djibouti, Equatorial Guinea, Eswatini, Grenada, Guinea-Bissau, Guyana, Kuwait, Liberia, Maldives, Monaco, Niue, Rwanda, Saint Vincent and the Grenadines, Samoa, São Tomé and Príncipe, Sierra Leone, Somalia, South Sudan, Timor-Leste, Tonga, and Trinidad and Tobago.

List of countries with World Heritage Sites

Countries with major concentrations of World Heritage Sites 
This overview lists the 32 countries with 10 or more World Heritage Sites:

See also 
 Index of conservation articles
 Lists of World Heritage Sites
 Former UNESCO World Heritage Sites
 List of World Heritage in Danger
 List of World Heritage Sites by year of inscription

Notes

References

External links 
 UNESCO World Heritage Sites – Official website
 List of UNESCO World Heritage Sites – Official website
 World Heritage Site – World Heritage Details website
 360° panophotography – The World Heritage List in pano-photography and virtual tours
 VRheritage.org – Documentation of World Heritage Sites
 UNESCO World Heritage List – Complete list with links and map of all sites
 whc.unesco.org – The Official World Heritage List in Google Earth (en français)
 whc.kmz – The World Heritage List in Google Earth (en français)
 Convention Concerning the Protection of the World Cultural and Natural Heritage at Law-Ref.org – Fully indexed and crosslinked with other documents
 Organization of World Heritage Cities – Dealing with urban sites only

 

Lists of tourist attractions by country